Tiago Ribeiro may refer to:

 Tiago Ribeiro (footballer, born 1992), Swiss football midfielder
 Tiago Ribeiro (footballer, born 2002), Portuguese football defensive midfielder

See also
 Thiago Ribeiro (disambiguation)